Highland Township is one of fifteen townships in Greene County, Indiana, USA. As of the 2010 census, its population was 718.

Geography
The streams of Camp Creek, Clark Creek, Dead Horse Branch, Goose Creek, Jim Creek and Kelly Branch run through this township.

Unincorporated towns
 Calvertville
 Tulip
(This list is based on USGS data and may include former settlements.)

Adjacent townships
 Franklin Township, Owen County (north)
 Beech Creek Township (east)
 Richland Township (south)
 Fairplay Township (southwest)
 Jefferson Township (west)

Cemeteries
The township contains nine cemeteries: Bucher, Calvertville, Goodwin, Kelley, Owens, Snyder, Stalcup, Wall and Walnut Grove.

Major highways

References
 
 United States Census Bureau cartographic boundary files

External links
 Indiana Township Association
 United Township Association of Indiana

Townships in Greene County, Indiana
Bloomington metropolitan area, Indiana
Townships in Indiana